The Ministry of Transportation and Communications (MOTC), is the regional executive department of the Bangsamoro Autonomous Region in Muslim Mindanao (BARMM) responsible for affairs related to communications and transportation in the region.

Chief Minister Murad Ebrahim appointed former Philippine Army officer Dickson Hermoso on July 15, 2020 as the first transportation and communications minister. Hermoso became the region's first Christian minister.

The MOTC was organized from the sectoral offices of the national government's Department of Transportation (DOTr) in the now defunct Autonomous Region in Muslim Mindanao. In September 2019, the DOTr facilitated the transfer of the Land Transportation Franchising and Regulatory Board's (LTFRB) Region 12 facilities to the MOTC. The DOTr also formally transferred its assets and functions to the MOTC on March 27, 2021.

Sectoral offices
Bangsamoro Airport Authority
Civil Aeronautics Board –Civil Aeronautics Board of the Bangsamoro
Land Transportation Franchising and Regulatory Board – Bangsamoro Land Transportation Franchising and Regulatory Board
Land Transportation Office – Bangsamoro Land Transportation Office
Maritime Industry Authority – Bangsamoro Maritime Industry Authority
National Telecommunications Commission – Bangsamoro Telecommuications Commission
Philippine Ports Authority – Bangsamoro Port Management Authority
Source:

Ministers

References

Transportation
Bangsamoro
Bangsamoro